Polysteganus praeorbitalis, the Scotsman or Scotsman seabream, is a species of marine fish in the seabream family (Sparidae) of order Perciformes. It is native to Southern Africa.

Description
Body is oblong, robust, and slightly compressed, with one continuous dorsal fin. The caudal fin is slightly forked. It has a distinctive body shape, and is easily recognised. The forehead is steep, and adults have a prominent hump on the nape. The deep body tapers towards the tail. Eyes are small.
Adults are mostly reddish pink to pale blue-green, with numerous blue dots on the upper body and pearly scales below the lateral line. There are usually some silvery to blue lines around the eyes. Juveniles may be more yellowish and have three brown longitudinal stripes.

Common length: 35.0 cm

Diagnostics
The dorsal fin has 12 spines, followed by 10 rays. The anal fin has 8 rays. The pectoral fin is subequal to the head, and the ventral fin has 1 spine and 5 rays. The lateral line has 59 to 66 scales. There are 15 to 16 gill rakers on the lower limb of the first gill arch. There are 2.5 to 2.8 times the body depth in the standard length, and 3 to 3.2 times the head length in the standard length.

Distribution and habitat
Algoa Bay in the Eastern Cape, South Africa; to Beira, Mozambique. Southern African endemic. Inhabits offshore reefs between 15 and 120m depth. The maximum age recorded is 13 years, at a length of 72 cm but it is believed to attain greater age based on size records.

Diet
Feeds mainly on small reef fishes, but also crustaceans and benthic cephalopods.

Reproduction 
Matures at about 40 cm in about 6 years. Aggregates for breeding and spawns off KwaZulu-Natal in winter, and possibly spring, mostly from Richard's Bay northwards. Normally solitary. Polysteganus praeorbitalis is thought to be a protogynous hermaphrodite but this is not yet confirmed.

Importance to humans
Commercial and recreational line fishery, catch restricted. Numbers have decreased considerably due to overfishing.

References

Fish described in 1859
Sparidae
Taxa named by Albert Günther